State Highway 22 (abbreviated SH-22) is a state highway in Oklahoma. There are no letter-suffixed spur highways branching from SH-22.

The SH-22 designation was first established on August 4, 1924. From its original termini of Davis and Durant, the route was extended to both the east and the west, reaching its greatest extent in 1933, connecting Duncan to the Texas state line at the Red River. In 1941, the portion of SH-22 west of Ravia was dropped, and the highway's eastern terminus was set in 1956.

Route description
SH-22 begins at SH-1 in the town of Ravia, in southern Johnston County.

In Tishomingo, SH-78 begins, concurrent with SH-22. The two highways run east for  before splitting from one another.

History

SH-22 once had a much longer route. When it was commissioned on August 4, 1924, it ran from Durant to Davis, the Ravia to Davis section being current SH-1 and SH-7. It ended at the original SH-4, current US-77. In 1932, SH-29 was given a new alignment to the north; SH-22 was reassigned to the old alignment. extending it to Duncan. On its other end, SH-22 was extended south from Durant, through Achille to a stub ending east of town. In January 1933, it was extended further east, to the Donham Bridge over the Red River. On December 17, 1934, the highway was rerouted over a stretch of Farm-to-Market road between Tishomingo and Nida, bypassing Milburn. This decision was reversed in 1935 (with the old alignment becoming SH-22S) but redone in 1936.

By 1939, SH-22 had been rerouted through Milburn. This time, the southern route became SH-299, which took over SH-22 between Nida and the state line. SH-22 was truncated once again on November 22, 1941, this time all the way to Ravia, the current western terminus of the route. SH-22 and SH-299 swapped places yet again in 1946, with SH-22 once again taking the southern route. In 1956, SH-22 was extended east to its current terminus at Bokchito. Other than minor realignments, the highway in 1956 was the same as it is today.

Junction list

References

External links

SH-22 at OKHighways

022
Transportation in Johnston County, Oklahoma
Transportation in Bryan County, Oklahoma